Bachorza  is a village in the administrative district of Gmina Sokołów Podlaski, which is located within Sokołów County, Masovian Voivodeship, in east-central Poland.

Geography

Landmarks 
In Bachorza there was a neo-classical manor house, the Bachorza manor.

References

Villages in Sokołów County